The Second Kretschmer cabinet is the current state government of Saxony, sworn in on 20 December 2019 after Michael Kretschmer was elected as Minister-President of Saxony by the members of the Landtag of Saxony. It is the 10th Cabinet of Saxony.

It was formed after the 2019 Saxony state election by the Christian Democratic Union (CDU), Alliance 90/The Greens (GRÜNE), and Social Democratic Party (SPD). Excluding the Minister-President, the cabinet comprises twelve ministers. Seven are members of the CDU, two are members of the Greens, two are members of the SPD, and one is an independent politician.

Formation 

The previous cabinet was a coalition government of the CDU and SPD led by Minister-President Michael Kretschmer.

The election took place on 1 September 2019, and resulted in significant losses for both governing parties. The opposition AfD achieved a major swing and became the second-largest party behind the CDU. The Left also suffered losses, while the Greens recorded a modest improvement and moved into fourth place ahead of the SPD.

Overall, the incumbent coalition lost its majority. The CDU ruled out cooperation with the AfD or The Left, leaving a Kenya coalition of the CDU, Greens, and SPD as the only practical option. The latter two parties stated they were open to discussions. Minister-President Krestchmer said he expected an unusually long period of negotiations due to the differences between the parties; the Saxony CDU is considered one of the most conservative party associations in Germany and particularly opposed to the Greens. The SPD called for exploratory talks the day after the election; on 7 September, the CDU and Greens also voted to open discussions. Meetings began a week later.

On 3 October, the three parties announced that exploratory talks had concluded successfully. The CDU and SPD voted on 11 October to begin coalition negotiations, followed by the Greens the next day. Discussions and meetings between working groups began during the week of 21 October. Negotiations continued to five weeks before an agreement was reached. The parties intended to unveil their draft agreement on 22 November, but were delayed by conflicts over the distribution of cabinet departments.

The coalition contract was presented on 1 December. It was approved by the CDU congress on 11 December, receiving the support of around 80% of delegates. The SPD and Greens both held membership ballots to approve the coalition. The results of the SPD vote were released on 16 December, with 74% voting in favour on 64% turnout. The Greens followed on 19 December, with 93% voting to approve the agreement.

Kretschmer was elected as Minister-President by the Landtag on 20 December 2019, winning 61 votes out of 118 cast. The coalition agreement was formally signed the same day, and the new cabinet sworn in.

Composition

External links

References 

Politics of Saxony
Government of Saxony
State governments of Germany
Cabinets established in 2019
2019 establishments in Germany